Yoshimi Battles the Hip-Hop Robots is a 2003 album by The Kleptones. It combines instrumental tracks from The Flaming Lips' Yoshimi Battles the Pink Robots with vocal tracks from various rap songs.

Track listing
 "Fight In The Club" – 4:17
Samples – Eminem, "The Real Slim Shady"
Vocals – 50 Cent, "In the Club"
Instrumental – The Flaming Lips, "Fight Test"
 "Song of the Hip Hop Robots" – 3:13
Vocals – Dead Prez, "Hip-Hop (Remix)"
Instrumental – The Flaming Lips, "One More Robot/Sympathy 3000-1"
 "Sympathy for the Almighty" – 1:12
Vocals – Doris Stokes
Instrumental – The Flaming Lips, "One More Robot/Sympathy 3000-1"
 "Love Song for Yoshimi" – 4:09
Vocals – Pharcyde, "Passin Me By"
Instrumental – The Flaming Lips, "Yoshimi Battles The Pink Robots, Pt. 1"
 "Battle Sequence" – 2:52
Vocals – Beastie Boys, "Hold It Now – Hit It!"
Instrumental – The Flaming Lips, "Yoshimi Battles The Pink Robots, Pt. 2"
 "My People Feel That Way In The Morning" – 6:17
Vocals – Missy Elliott, "4 My People"
Vocals – Blackalicious, "Make You Feel That Way"
Instrumental – The Flaming Lips, "In The Morning Of The Magicians"
 "Chess Game At The Gates Of Hell" – 4:18
Vocals – Busta Rhymes, "Woo Hah! Got You All In Check"
Instrumental – The Flaming Lips, "Ego Tripping At The Gates Of Hell"
 "Are You A Visionary?" – 5:02
Samples – Martin Luther King Jr. (from his 1963 speech "I Have a Dream")
Vocals – Public Enemy, "By The Time I Get To Arizona"
Instrumental – The Flaming Lips, "Are You A Hypnotist??"
 "Breathe In The Summertime" – 5:05
Vocals – Q-Tip, "Breathe and Stop"
Instrumental – The Flaming Lips, "It's Summertime"
 "Have You Come To Realise" – 3:52
Samples – Ferris Bueller's Day Off
Vocals – The Streets, "Has It Come To This?"
Instrumental – The Flaming Lips, "Do You Realize??"
 "All We Have Is Soul" – 3:51
Vocals – Eric B & Rakim, "I Know You Got Soul"
Vocals –  KaMillion – "Who Stole The Soul?" 
Instrumental – The Flaming Lips, "All We Have Is Now"
 "Last Words (A Tribute)" – 3:02
Vocals – Bill Hicks
Instrumental – The Flaming Lips, "Approaching Pavonis Mons by Balloon (Utopia Planitia)"

See also
Bastard pop

References

External links

The Kleptones albums
2003 remix albums
2003 debut albums
Hip hop remix albums
The Flaming Lips